Emam Reza (also Romanized as Emām Reẕā) is a village in Jayezan Rural District, Jayezan District, Omidiyeh County, Khuzestan Province, Iran. At the 2006 census, its population was 66, in 14 families.

References 

Populated places in Omidiyeh County